The Canadian Record is a newspaper of Canadian, Texas.

The publication began around 1890, and the newspaper cites 1893 as its beginning date.

In 1948 Ben Ezzell acquired the newspaper. He opposed the Vietnam War and supported the Civil rights movement. Circa 1993 Ezzell's daughter, Laurie Ezzell Brown, took control of the newspaper after Ben Ezzell died. In 2023 Brown, citing stress from the constant work, decided to put the publication up for sale and to end making print copies. Publication itself had ceased. It was the final print newspaper in Canadian.

References

External links
 The Canadian Record

Hemphill County, Texas
Newspapers published in Texas
1893 establishments in Texas
Newspapers established in 1893
2023 disestablishments in Texas
Publications disestablished in 2023